Ahmadabad (also Romanized as Aḩmadābād; also known as Akhmetabad) is a village in Zarjabad Rural District, Firuz District, Kowsar County, Ardabil Province, Iran. At the 2006 census, its population was 284, in 49 families.

References 

Towns and villages in Kowsar County